The Lawrence Wilson Art Gallery is an on-campus art gallery at the University of Western Australia in Crawley.

History
The gallery was established in July 1990.

Description

It is supported by a "friends of" organisation. It contains collections, including the Cruthers Collection of Women's Art, and has hosted a range of exhibitions across a wide scope of artistic practices.

The building is also shared by the Berndt Museum.

Selected exhibitions 

Here&Now15, an exhibition of experimental sculpture, which included the work of Abdul-Rahman Abdullah (April–? 2015)

 Artemis - No Second Thoughts - Reflections on the Artemis Women's Art Forum  (1 September - 8 December 2018)

 The Long Kiss Goodbye  (8 February - 9 May 2020)

See also 
  Art Gallery of Western Australia

References

External links 

 

University of Western Australia

Art museums and galleries in Western Australia